Ateneria is a monotypic moth genus of the family Noctuidae. Its only species, Ateneria crinipuncta, is found in French Guiana. Both the genus and the species were first described by Schaus in 1914.

References

Catocalinae
Monotypic moth genera